Camp Wildwood may be: 
Camp Wildwood (Florida)
Camp Wildwood (Indiana)
Camp Wildwood (Massachusetts)